The 1984 MAAC men's basketball tournament was held March 8–10 with the quarterfinal round held at the New Haven Coliseum in New Haven, Connecticut and the semifinals and championship game held at the Meadowlands Arena in East Rutherford, New Jersey.

Iona defeated  in the championship game, 72–61, to win their second MAAC men's basketball tournament in three years.

The Gaels received a bid to the 1984 NCAA tournament where they were beaten by Virginia in the opening round, 57–56.

Format
All eight of the conference's members participated in the tournament field. They were seeded based on regular season conference records, with all teams starting play in the quarterfinal round. An additional third place game was also played on the last day of the tournament.

Quarterfinal games were played at the New Haven Coliseum in New Haven, Connecticut. All remaining games were played at a neutral site at the Meadowlands Arena in East Rutherford, New Jersey.

Bracket

References

MAAC men's basketball tournament
1983–84 Metro Atlantic Athletic Conference men's basketball season
1984 in sports in New Jersey